Princess Cinderella is a 1941 Italian fantasy-comedy film written and directed by Sergio Tofano. It is based on the characters of the popular comic strip series Signor Bonaventura, created in 1917 by the same Tofano for the children magazine Corriere dei Piccoli.

Plot 
After her marriage to Prince Charming, Cinderella spends her days in their luxurious palace, keeping his affability with all the people around her, but her two stepsisters, always envious of her, manage to get her away from the palace. The Prince falls into a state of despair, but Bonaventura promises him to go in search of the girl and bring her back. After fighting bitter enemies such as Barbariccia and the Ogre,  helped by the loyal Cecè and by the Little Fairy he will finally succeed.

Cast 

Paolo Stoppa as Bonaventura
Silvana Jachino as   Cinderella 
Roberto Villa as Prince Charming
Sergio Tofano as the Doctor
Guglielmo Barnabò as the King
Rosetta Tofano as  Pasqualina
Mercedes Brignone as the Queen
Piero Carnabuci as Barbariccia
Mario Pisu as  Cecè 
Camillo Pilotto as the Ogre
Renato Chiantoni as Gambamoscia
Amelia Chellini as the Witch

References

External links

Princess Cinderella at Variety Distribution

1940s fantasy comedy films
1940s Italian-language films
Italian fantasy comedy films
1941 directorial debut films
1941 films
Films based on Cinderella
Films based on Italian comics
Films about royalty
Live-action films based on comics
Italian black-and-white films
1941 comedy films
Films scored by Renzo Rossellini
1940s Italian films